Shyam Singha Roy is a 2021 Indian Telugu-language romantic drama film directed by Rahul Sankrityan. Partly set in the backdrop of Kolkata in the 1970s, it is based on the theme of reincarnation. The film stars Nani in a dual role alongside Sai Pallavi, Krithi Shetty and Madonna Sebastian. In the film, Vasu is an aspiring filmmaker who stalks Keerthy because he wants her to act in his short film. She doesn’t put up with his creepy ways and gives it back. One day, during the shooting of the short film, Vasu gets a rabbit punch during a brawl. From then on, he gets flashes of his past life as Shyam Singha Roy.

The film was announced in February 2020 and principal photography took place from December 2020 to July 2021 in Hyderabad and Kolkata. It was theatrically released on 24 December 2021 and opened to mixed to positive reviews with critics praising the direction, writing, music, editing, cinematography and cast performances (particularly Nani, Pallavi, Sebastian) while criticizing the screenplay. It emerged as a success in the box office.

Plot 
Vasu is an aspiring film director in Hyderabad. To impress a film producer, he starts making a short film and finds Keerthi, a psychology graduate to be the lead. After some resistance, Keerthi agrees to act in the film, and the shoot is completed within a few days. One day while shooting, some goons sexually harass Keerthi leading to Vasu fighting them. In that ongoing fight, a guy hits him on his head, which leads him to ear bleeding and starts suffering from a psychological disorder that temporarily manifest him into a different personality.

Impressed with the short film, the producer green-lights Vasu's feature film. A year later, Vasu releases his film, Uniki, which turns out to be successful. Vasu is offered to remake the film in Hindi but during a press conference for the remake in Mumbai, Vasu is arrested on charges of copyright infringement. A notable publishing house based in Kolkata, SR Publications, alleges that Vasu copied their best-selling novel Astitva written by Shyam Singha Roy fifty years ago. In court, strong evidence is presented against Vasu, and Keerthi's cousin Padmavathi takes up the case. Vasu pleads his innocence and after a successful polygraph test, the court releases him on unconditional bail and gives them 3 days to present their case. Upon Keerthi's suggestion, Vasu undergoes clinical hypnosis with the help of Keerthi's psychology professor, during which he reveals that he was Shyam Singha Roy in a past life and Rosie was his wife.

In West Bengal in 1969, Shyam Singha Roy is an influential social reformer and revolutionary writer with communist ideologies, who comes from a conservative family. As his family disapproves of his methods, he decides to leave but stumbles upon Maitreyi, a devadasi from Bangladesh who dances in the temple during the Navaratri. Despite being an atheist, Shyam visits the temple every night to see Maitreyi. One night, he asks her to sneak out of the temple with him and she reluctantly agrees. Shyam and Maitreyi fall for each other, and Shyam renames Maitreyi as Rosie. They decide to elope, however, on that night, the temple's high priest Mahant, who sexually preys on devadasis, selects a young girl to sleep with, which Rosie opposes. Mahant physically assaults Rosie in anger and disrespects her by urinating on her. Upon discovering this, an enraged Shyam attacks Mahant in the temple, during the Navaratri festival. After a fight, Shyam leaps onto the statue of Durga, takes the sword, castrates him, and throws him onto burning coal, killing him and removing the necklace on Maitreyi, implying discontinuing her duties as Devadasi.

Shyam and Maitreyi, having formally changed her name to Rosie, move to Calcutta where he starts working in a printing press. By 1977, Shyam becomes an accomplished yet controversial writer of his time. On Rosie's suggestion, Shyam opens up a trust to rehabilitate devadasis. Shyam's brother, Manoj, requests him to visit their village to see their ailing elder brother. However, upon their arrival, his two elder brothers send Manoj to bring tender coconuts, which turns out to be a ploy to murder Shyam for bringing disrepute to their family by killing Mahant at the temple and marrying Rosie, who is not of their caste. Manoj arrives but is unable to save Shyam, who dies in front of him. The two elder brothers are killed in an accident a few years later and Shyam's nephews now run SR Publications, Singha Roy's publishing house.

In the present, Vasu visits the printing press in Kolkata where Shyam worked. However, he is told that Shyam and Rosie died decades ago, Rosie having left to find Shyam. Padmavathi submits Vasu's hypnosis report as evidence in the court that Shyam Singha Roy is reincarnated as Vasu. However, the prosecution lawyer objects, stating there is no scientific evidence of reincarnation. While the court is about to give its judgment, an 85-year-old Manoj visits the court and declares Vasu to be Shyam's reincarnation. Upon being asked for proof, Manoj explains that Vasu adapted Shyam's short story Varna as his short film Varnam, but that story was never published in the public domain. Manoj submits Shyam's hand-written manuscript of the story as proof and withdraws the case as the chairman of SR Publications. Vasu is acquitted of all charges.

Manoj reveals to Vasu that Rosie is alive and waiting for him. Vasu then visits an aged Rosie, who now runs a dance school named after Shyam. Upon meeting Vasu, both have an emotional reunion and as per her wish, Rosie dies peacefully in his arms.

Cast 

 Nani in a dual role as 
Shyam Singha Roy, a legendary Bengali writer
Vasudev Ghanta "Vasu", an aspiring filmmaker 
 Sai Pallavi as Maithreyi alias Rosie, a former Devadasi turned Shyam's wife
 Krithi Shetty as Keerthi, Vasu's girlfriend
 Madonna Sebastian as Lawyer Padmavathi, Keerthi's cousin
 Rahul Ravindran as Manoj Singha Roy
 Abhinav Gomatam as Pramod
 Jisshu Sengupta as Debendra Singha Roy
 Murali Sharma as Lawyer Krishnamurthy
 Manish Wadhwa as Mahadev Mahant
 Leela Samson as Psychologist
 Subhalekha Sudhakar as Judge J. Satyendra
 Sivannarayana Naripeddi as Keerthi's father
 Barun Chanda as Sayan Sarkar, Printing Press Owner
 Sadhwi Majumder as Shashi, Rosie's best friend
 Pradeep Rudra as Shyam Singha Roy's nephew
 Anurag Kulkarni in a cameo appearance in the song "Pranavalaya"

Production

Development 
On 18 December 2019, Rahul Sankrityan narrated a script to Nani, which was considered to be an "innovative story". The project was initially reported to be produced under Suryadevara Naga Vamsi's Sithara Entertainments banner, who initially worked with Nani in Jersey (2019). The film was announced in February 2020, with the title Shyam Singha Roy, and was expected to go on floors in May 2020, although the launch was delayed due to the COVID-19 pandemic in India. During March 2020, A. R. Rahman was approached to compose music for the film, and Nirav Shah was in charge of handling the cinematography. Later Anirudh Ravichander was announced as the composer as Rahman apparently did not accept the offer. The film was meant to be Anirudh's third collaboration with Nani after Jersey and Nani's Gang Leader.

The film was expected to be made on a huge scale, marking the most expensive film in Nani's career. However, producer Naga Vamsi wanted to cut down the budget citing the pandemic, as the estimated cost was much higher; Vamsi wanted to shelve the project, while Nani was completing the shoot of Tuck Jagadish. Due to differences of opinion between Nani and Vamsi, the production was handed over to Venkat Boyanapalli, who would be producing the film under his newly established banner Niharika Entertainment.

On 25 October 2020, a new poster was launched coinciding with Dusshera, with the inclusion of composer Mickey J. Meyer, cinematographer Sanu John Varghese and editor Naveen Nooli. Director Sankrityan revealed that the film is based on the theme of reincarnation and partially set against the backdrop of Kolkata.

Casting 
Sai Pallavi, who also collaborated with Nani in Middle Class Abbayi, was cast in the film. It was reported that Rashmika Mandanna was approached for a lead role, although Krithi Shetty was finalized later. Madonna Sebastian was also confirmed as a lead, marking her come back to the Telugu cinema after Premam (2016). Murali Sharma, Abhinav Gomatam, and Rahul Ravindran were later included in the cast. In March 2021, Bengali actor Jisshu Sengupta was signed to play an important role in the film. This also marked the Telugu debut for Bharatanatyam dancer, Leela Samson.

Filming 
The film was launched at a private ceremony in Hyderabad on 11 December 2020, in the presence of the cast and crew, and Nani's father gave the muhurat shot for the film. Principal photography began on 21 December 2020 in Hyderabad, India. A Kolkata-themed street along with the Kalighat Kali Temple was constructed on a budget of 6 crores. In February 2021, the team began filming crucial scenes in Kolkata. Filming was briefly halted due to COVID-19 lockdown in India and was resumed in July 2021. The Kolkata set in Hyderabad was damaged due to heavy rains and was restored by art director Avinash Kolla. Filming was completed on 26 July 2021 and post-production began.

Music 

The soundtrack album is composed by Mickey J. Meyer and the audio rights were acquired by Saregama. The song "Pranavalaya" is set in the popular Carnatic raga "Shuddha Dhanyasi" (known as Raag "Dhani" in Hindustani Music), which became a popular classical dance number.

Telugu version

Tamil version

Release

Theatrical 
The film was originally scheduled for release on 24 December 2020, coinciding with Christmas, but was eventually postponed as filming was delayed due to the COVID-19 pandemic. The film was released on 24 December 2021. Apart from Telugu, the film was dubbed and released in Tamil, Malayalam, and Kannada languages.

Home media 
Gemini TV acquired the satellite rights of the film in Telugu, while Netflix acquired the digital rights in Telugu, Tamil, and Malayalam. The film began streaming through Netflix on 21 January 2022.

Reception

Box office
Movie overall business valued at 130  crore and it collected 14 crore in Nizam, 36 crore in Andhra Pradesh and in both Telugu speaking states it collected 28 crore distributor share of gross 53 crore. Total worldwide it collected share of 65 crore.

Critical response 
Shyam Singha Roy received mixed to positive reviews with critics praising the performances while criticizing the screenplay. 

Sangeetha Devi Dundoo of The Hindu opnied that "This isn't to say that this is a sub par film. But with a little more thought, it could have been way smarter. Despite these niggles, there's plenty going for Shyam Singha Roy". Giving a rating of 3.5 out of 5, Neeshita Nyayapati of The Times of India wrote: "Shyam Singha Roy might not have a story that's completely out of the box but the staging does have the potential to bowl you over. Barring the underwhelming aspects, give this one a chance this weekend if you're longing for something that's well-made and backed by a stellar cast", appreciating the acting performances of Nani and Sai Pallavi, and the story. Calling it "engrossing", The News Minute's Sowmya Rajendran too gave a rating of 3.5 out of 5. She has praised the screenplay, story, direction and acting by the ensemble cast, commenting that "Sai Pallavi is the show-stealer, performing a role that's tailor-made for her".

Manoj Kumar R of The Indian Express called the film "a revolutionary romantic tale". He finally wrote: "To director-writer Rahul Sankrityan's credit, the film's hero lives and fights by the pen, instead of resorting to violence. The period portions of the film is a sight for sore eyes. The retro look of Nani and Sai Pallavi oozes charm. Pallavi's classical dance performance draped in a red saree is a sight to behold. Just her presence on the screen elevates a scene to another level". Firstpost's Sankeertana Varma praised the technical department of the film stating: "Navin Nooli's editing, too, helps intertwine the two timelines to give the viewer a glimpse into Vasu's psyche—what he is seeing and how unclear it all is. Sanu John Varughese's cinematography and Kolla Avinash's production design shoulder the film as well. While Sanu's camera daftly manoeuvres between the two timelines—the way Sai Pallavi's introduction song is shot, choreographed, and cut needs special mention, Avinash's period detailing does transport the viewer to a time gone by". Writing for India Today, Janani K said that "Cinematographer Sanu John Varghese's visuals, especially in the period portions, are exceptional. Music by Mickey J Meyer tugs at our heartstrings. Shyam Singha Roy could have been a taut and crisp story about reincarnation. Since it takes a familiar route, the overall effect takes a dip". Prakash Pecheti of Telangana Today felt that the film falls short of becoming a masterpiece. He further wrote: "'Shyam Singha Roy' would've been an engaging one if characters had some depth in establishing them. One might even think that a realistic approach might have fetched the story well".

Accolades

Notes

References

External links 

 

Indian supernatural thriller films
Indian supernatural films
Films shot in Hyderabad, India
Films set in Kolkata
Films about reincarnation
Films postponed due to the COVID-19 pandemic
Film productions suspended due to the COVID-19 pandemic
Films set in Hyderabad, India
Films set in West Bengal
Films set in Mumbai
Films set in 2020
Films set in 2021
Films set in 1969
Films set in 1977